Alfred Kohn (22 February 1867 – 15 January 1959) headed the Institute of Histology at the Medical Faculty of German University in Prague for 26 years. He discovered the nature and origin of parathyroid glands and pioneered research on chromaffin cells and sympathetic paraganglia. Kohn's papers covered topics including the pituitary, interstitial cells of testes, and ovaries, all of which relate to endocrinology. All of his studies were based on descriptive and comparative histological and embryological observations. Kohn was twice the dean of German Medical Faculty, and an honorary member of many scientific societies. He was repeatedly nominated for Nobel Prize for physiology and medicine. Due to his Jewish origin, he was expelled from Deutsche Gesellschaft der Wissenschaften und Künste für die Tschechoslowakische Republik in 1939 and transported to Terezin (Theresienstadt) ghetto in 1943. After World War II, he lived in Prague. On his 90th birthday, he was elected honorary president of Anatomische Gesellschaft and awarded by the Czechoslovak Order of Labour.  Alfred Kohn died in 1959.

References

Nanka, O., & Grim, M. (2008). Alfred Kohn, profesor histologie na Nĕmecké Univerzitĕ v Praze [Alfred Kohn, professor of histology at German University in Prague]. Casopis lekaru ceskych, 147(4), 240–244.

Histologists
19th-century Czech scientists
1867 births
1959 deaths